Cecropterus casica, the desert cloudywing, is a species of dicot skipper in the butterfly family Hesperiidae. It is found in Central America and North America.

References

Further reading

 

Eudaminae
Articles created by Qbugbot
Butterflies described in 1869
Butterflies of Central America
Butterflies of North America
Taxa named by Gottlieb August Wilhelm Herrich-Schäffer